The 2020 Atlantic 10 Conference men's soccer season is the 34th season of men's college soccer in the Atlantic 10 Conference. The season was scheduled to begin on August 29, 2020 and conclude on November 6, 2020, but was postponed due to the COVID-19 pandemic. The season is scheduled to begin on February 3, 2021 and conclude on April 11, 2021.

Rhode Island entered the season as the defending regular season and tournament champions, but failed to defend both titles. Dayton won the regular season, while Fordham won the A10 Tournament.

Background

Previous season 

Rhode Island won the college soccer double by winning the Atlantic 10 regular season and tournament. The Rams finished the season with a record of 14–4–3, 7–1–0 in Atlantic 10 play. In the NCAA Tournament Rhode Island lost 3–4 to UConn in the opening round.

Dayton's Jonas Fjeldberg won the Offensive Player of the Year. Fordham's Jørgen Oland won the Defensive Player of the Year. Dayton's Kingsford Adjei won the Midfielder of the Year. Rhode Island head coach, Gareth Elliott, won the Coach of the Year Award. Finally, Dayton's Toluwalase Oladeinbo won the Freshman of the Year Award. Rhode Island's Peder Kristiansen won third-team All-American honors by TopDrawer Soccer and Soccer America. VCU's Ryo Shimazaki was the first Atlantic 10 player selected in the 2020 MLS SuperDraft, drafted in the third round with the 59th pick by Columbus Crew.

Stadiums and locations

Coaching changes 
Long-time George Mason head coach, Greg Andrulis, resigned at the end of the 2019 season, coaching the program for 15 seasons. Andrulis was replaced by former North Carolina and Creighton coach, Elmar Bolowich, who was hired on January 13, 2020.

Impact of the COVID-19 pandemic on the season 

Teams were divided into pods for the season:

 West: Dayton, Duquesne, Saint Louis, St. Bonaventure
 North: Fordham La Salle, Rhode Island, Saint Joseph's, UMass
 Central: Davidson, George Mason, George Washington, VCU

Head coaches

Preseason

Preseason poll 
The preseason poll was announced on February 2, 2021.

Preseason awards 
To be announced.

Preseason fixtures 

All times Eastern time.

Regular season 

All times Eastern time.

Week 1 (Feb. 3 – Feb. 7)

Week 2 (Feb. 8 – Feb. 14)

Week 3 (Feb. 15 – Feb. 21)

Week 4 (Feb. 22 – Feb. 28)

Week 5 (Mar. 1 – Mar. 7)

Week 6 (Mar. 8 – Mar. 14)

Week 7 (Mar. 15 – Mar. 21)

Week 8 (Mar. 22 – Mar. 28)

Week 9 (Mar. 29 – Apr. 4)

Week 10 (Apr. 5 – Apr. 11)

Postseason

A-10 Tournament 

Due to the COVID-19 pandemic, the Atlantic 10 Tournament only had four teams participate.

NCAA Tournament 

The NCAA Tournament was reduced from 48 to 36 teams due to the pandemic.

Rankings

National

Regional – Southeast Regional 

The United Soccer Coaches' Southeast Regional compared Atlantic 10 teams to teams in the Sun Belt Conference and Conference USA.

2021 MLS Draft 

The 2021 MLS SuperDraft was held on January 21, 2021. One players from the conference was drafted.

Total picks by school

List of selections

Awards

Player of the Week

Player of the Year

National honors 
To be announced.

Regional honors 
To be announced.

Notes

References

External links 
 Atlantic 10 Men's Soccer

 
2020 NCAA Division I men's soccer season